Mark Philippoussis was the defending champion but lost in the first round to Jonas Björkman.

Andy Roddick won in the final 6–4, 3–6, 7–5 against James Blake.

Seeds
A champion seed is indicated in bold text while text in italics indicates the round in which that seed was eliminated.

  Tommy Haas (quarterfinals)
  Andy Roddick (champion)
  Jan-Michael Gambill (semifinals)
  Xavier Malisse (semifinals)
  Rainer Schüttler (quarterfinals)
  Jonas Björkman (second round)
  Davide Sanguinetti (second round)
  James Blake (final)

Draw

External links
 ATP main draw

2002 Kroger St. Jude International
Singles